Mini Monsters is an EP release by Christian rock group Jars of Clay, which preceded the release of their 2006 studio album, Good Monsters. The EP was released exclusively through online digital music stores, such as iTunes, Walmart.com, etc. The track "Love Me" is a B-side from the recording sessions of Good Monsters.

Track listing
Note: All tracks written by Charlie Lowell, Dan Haseltine, Matt Odmark, Stephen Mason, unless otherwise noted
"Work" (Radio Edit) - 3:39
"Dead Man (Carry Me)" - 3:19
"Love Me" - 3:11

2006 EPs
Jars of Clay EPs
Essential Records (Christian) EPs